was the eleventh of the sixty-nine stations of the Nakasendō. It is located in the present-day city of Takasaki, Gunma Prefecture, Japan.

History
Though Shinmachi-shuku is the eleventh post station on the Nakasendō, it was the last station to be developed.

Neighboring post towns
Nakasendō
Honjō-shuku - Shinmanchi-shuku - Kuragano-shuku

References

Stations of the Nakasendō
Post stations in Gunma Prefecture